Jack Carey (1889 – 1934) was an American jazz trombonist and the leader of the Crescent City Orchestra. The authorship of the famous Tiger Rag tune is attributed to him by some. During his career, he performed with Sidney Bechet. Carey was the older brother of Mutt Carey.

References

American jazz bandleaders
American jazz trombonists
Male trombonists
1889 births
1934 deaths
20th-century trombonists
20th-century American male musicians
American male jazz musicians
People from Hahnville, Louisiana